Fairey may refer to:

People
Charles Richard Fairey, British aircraft manufacturer
David Fairey, English cricketer
Francis Fairey (1887 - 1971), Canadian politician
Jim Fairey, baseball player
Mike Fairey, British businessman
Shepard Fairey, American artist, designed the Barack Obama "Hope" poster

Companies

Fairey Aviation Company, British aircraft company
Avions Fairey, the Belgian-based subsidiary of the British Fairey Aviation Company
Fairey Marine Ltd, a shipbuilding company based on the River Hamble, Southampton, England

Aircraft
Many "Fairey" aircraft were made by the Fairey Aviation Company — see Fairey Aviation Company § Aircraft

Other
Fairey Fireflash was the first British air-to-air missile
Fairey Band is a brass band based in Heaton Chapel in Stockport, Greater Manchester